The Al Maktoum Challenge, Round 3, is a horse race run over a distance of 2,000 metres (one and a quarter miles) on dirt in March at Meydan Racecourse in Dubai. It is the third of three races in the Al Maktoum Challenge series which serve as trial races for the Dubai World Cup.

It was first run in 1994 on dirt at Nad Al Sheba Racecourse. It was transferred to Meydan in 2010 where it was run on the synthetic Tapeta Footings surface. In 2015 the synthetic surface at Meydan was replaced by a dirt track.

The race was originally run over 52,400 metres before he current distance was established in 1996.

The race began as an ungraded stakes race before attaining Listed status in 1996. The race was elevated to Group 3 level in 2000 and became a Group 2 event in 2002. The race became a Group 1 event in 2012.

Records
Record time:
1:59.60 - Dubai Millennium (2000)

Most wins by a horse:
 2 - Salute The Soldier (2021, 2023)

Most wins by a jockey:
 7 - Frankie Dettori (1996, 1997, 2000, 2002, 2003, 2006, 2008)

Most wins by a trainer:
 11 - Saeed bin Suroor (1996, 1997, 1999, 2000, 2002, 2003, 2006, 2008, 2013, 2014, 2015)

Most wins by an owner:
 8 - Godolphin Racing (1996, 2000, 2002, 2003, 2006, 2008, 2013, 2015)

Winners

See also
 List of United Arab Emirates horse races

References

Racing Post:

Horse races in the United Arab Emirates
Recurring events established in 1994
Nad Al Sheba Racecourse
1994 establishments in the United Arab Emirates